Crimson Death is a melodic death metal band founded in 1994 by Geyner Valencia and Edgar Rodríguez, in Arequipa, Peru, playing metal in the vein of the Gothenburg Sound.

Discography

Members

Current members
Geyner Valencia - guitar, vocals (1994–present)
Alvaro Valencia - bass guitar (2012–present)
Manuel Reynoso - drums (2013–present)
Paul Valencia - guitar (2014–present)

Former members
Eduardo Moya - drums (1995–1998)
Victor Calvo - bass guitar (2001–2005)
Rafael Cubillas - drums (1998–2006)
Karelia Hani - drums (2006–2008)
Alonso Guevara - drums (2008–2009)
Edgar Rodríguez - guitar (1994–2010)
Emmanuel Tejada - drums (2009-2010)
Carlos Delgado - bass guitar (1995–2001;2005–2010)

Session musicians
Mario Callata - additional keyboards (2005)

External links
 Official website
 Official Myspace
 Crimson Death at Metalstorm.ee
 Crimson Death interview at Metalstorm.ee

Peruvian death metal musical groups
Melodic death metal musical groups
Musical groups established in 1994
Musical quartets
1994 establishments in Peru